The High-Speed SECS Message Services (HSMS) protocol is a standard transport protocol for communication between computers in semiconductor factories. HSMS defines a TCP/IP based Ethernet connection and is intended as a high speed alternative to the simple SECS-I protocol. Formally known as SEMI E37, HSMS is a SEMI standard.

External links 
Latest version of the HSMS standard

Semiconductor device fabrication

de:SEMI Equipment Communication Standard